Ben Whittaker (born 10 October 1989) is an Australian rugby union footballer. Whittaker played for the Western Force and Melbourne Rebels in Super Rugby, and French side Biarritz. 
His regular playing position is hooker. Whittaker made his Super Rugby debut during the 2009 Super 14 season against the Lions in Perth.

External links 
Melbourne Rebels Player Profile
itsrugby.co.uk profile

Living people
1989 births
Australian rugby union players
Rugby union hookers
Western Force players
Melbourne Rebels players
Biarritz Olympique players
People educated at Barker College
Australian expatriate rugby union players
Australian expatriate sportspeople in France
Expatriate rugby union players in France
Rugby union players from Canberra